is a Japanese football player who plays midfield for Kyoto Sanga FC in J2 League.

Club career statistics
Updated to 20 July 2022.

Honours

Shonan Bellmare
J2 League (1): 2014

References

External links
Profile at Consadole Sapporo

Profile at Ehime FC

1994 births
Living people
Association football people from Aichi Prefecture
Japanese footballers
J1 League players
J2 League players
Japan Football League players
Fukushima United FC players
Shonan Bellmare players
Ehime FC players
Hokkaido Consadole Sapporo players
Kyoto Sanga FC players
Association football wingers